, was a Japanese musician and music producer. He debuted as a musician in 1986 as the guitarist for the band Shijin no Chi, later forming the duo Oh! Penelope with former bandmate Mutsuji Tsuji. Since the mid-1990s, Watanabe worked as a music producer, creating songs such as Chara's "Yasashii Kimochi" (1997), Hitomi's "Love 2000" and Ikimonogakari's "Hana wa Sakura Kimi wa Utsukushi" (2008). In 2000, Watanabe launched a solo project entitled Atami.

Biography 
Watanabe debuted as a member of the band Shijin no Chi, through Epic Records Japan. By 1993, the three-person unit had released five studio albums. In March 1994, Watanabe retooled the group as a duo, creating Oh! Penelope with Shijin no Chi's vocalist Mutsuji Tsuji. Oh! Penelope's mini album Photograph (1995) was one of the first enhanced CDs released in Japan. After releasing their debut full-length album Milk & Cookies in March 1997, the band disbanded by June. After the band's disbandment, Watanabe focused on working as a music producer, producing music such as Chara's "Yasashii Kimochi" (1997) and "70% (Yūgure no Uta)" (1999), Hitomi songs such as "Love 2000" and "Samurai Drive" (2001).

In April 2000, Watanabe began working on Atami (stylised as atami), a solo music project involving guest vocalists, such as Miho Hatori, Chara, Hitomi and Kirinji. Atami's delf-titled debut album released in February 2001. In 2002, the band's single "Under the Sun" with Bonnie Pink was used as the theme song for the Yōsuke Kubozuka-starring film Laundry. In March, the second Atami album was released.

In addition to popular music, Watanabe worked as a music producer for the films Laundry (2001), Gravity's Clowns (2009), On Next Sunday (2009) and My Rainy Days (2009). In 2012, Watanabe worked as the music producer for the NHK drama Hatsukoi, and in 2013 for the anime Nagi-Asu: A Lull in the Sea.

After a long period of illness, Watanabe died of pancreatic cancer on 27 July 2021.

Atami discography

Studio albums

Compilation albums

Singles

Production discography

References 

1963 births
2021 deaths
20th-century Japanese guitarists
20th-century Japanese musicians
21st-century Japanese guitarists
21st-century Japanese musicians
Deaths from pancreatic cancer
Japanese electronic musicians
Japanese film score composers
Japanese male film score composers
Japanese music arrangers
Japanese television composers
Male television composers
Musicians from Okayama Prefecture